The Regius Professorship of Greek is one of the oldest professorships at the University of Cambridge. The Regius Professor chair was founded in 1540 by Henry VIII with a stipend of £40 per year, subsequently increased in 1848 by a canonry of Ely Cathedral.

Regius Professors of Greek

Official coat of arms
According to a grant of 1590, the office of Regius Professor of "Greke" at Cambridge has a coat of arms with the following blazon: Per chevron argent and sable, in chief the two Greek letters Alpha and Omega of the second, and in base a cicada (grasshopper) of the first, on a chief gules a lion passant guardant Or, charged on the side with the letter G sable.  The crest has an owl.

Sources

Concise Dictionary of National Biography
Cheke (to 1551), Carr, Dodington (to 1585), Downes (to 1624), Creighton (to 1639), Duport (to 1654), Widdrington, Barrow, Barnes, Fraigneau (to 1750), Francklin (to 1759), Cooke (to 1792), Dobree (to 1725)

See also

Regius Professor of Greek (Oxford)
Regius Professor of Greek (Dublin)

 
Greek, Regius
Faculty of Classics, University of Cambridge
1540 establishments in England
Greek, Cambridge
Greek, Regius, Cambridge
Greek, Regius, Cambridge